Beaver Towers: The Dark Dream is a 1997 novel by British author Nigel Hinton. It is the fourth and final installment in the Beaver Towers series. It follows the story of Philip on his travels with Mr Edgar and the animals of Beaver Towers when a monster called Retsnom tried to control them.

References

External links
 Article of the book on the author's official website

1997 British novels
1997 children's books
British children's books
British children's novels
British fantasy novels
Children's fantasy novels
Children's novels about animals
Talking animals in fiction
Puffin Books books
Beaver Towers Series